A compound of tetrahedra might be:
Compound of two tetrahedra – stellated octahedron
Compound of three tetrahedra
Compound of four tetrahedra
Compound of five tetrahedra
Compound of six tetrahedra
Compound of six tetrahedra with rotational freedom
Compound of ten tetrahedra
Compound of twelve tetrahedra with rotational freedom

Polyhedral compounds